Kaden Fulcher (born September 23, 1998) is a Canadian professional ice hockey goaltender currently playing with the Reading Royals of the ECHL. He has formerly played with the Detroit Red Wings of the National Hockey League (NHL), Toledo Walleye of the ECHL and the Grand Rapids Griffins of the AHL.

Playing career

Junior
Fulcher was drafted 241st overall by the Sarnia Sting in the 2014 OHL Priority Selection. During the 2015–16 season, Fulcher began the season with the Sarnia Sting, where he posted a 2–0–1 record in three games, with a 3.30 goals-against average (GAA) and .890 save percentage. On January 7, 2016, he was traded to the Hamilton Bulldogs in exchange for goaltender Charlie Graham. He finished the season with a 4–10 record, with a 4.48 GAA and .876 save percentage in 14 games for the Bulldogs.

During the 2017–18 season, Fulcher posted a 32–17–6 regular-season record for the Hamilton Bulldogs, with a 2.86 GAA and .899 save percentage. On March 1, 2018, Fulcher won his 30th game of the season, setting a single-season franchise record for the most wins. During the playoffs he posted a 16–5 record, with a 2.70 GAA and .905 save percentage to help the Bulldogs win the J. Ross Robertson Cup, their first championship in franchise history. With the win, the Bulldogs advanced to the 2018 Memorial Cup, where Fulcher posted a 2–2 record with a 2.27 GAA and a .918 save percentage. Following the tournament, he was awarded the Hap Emms Memorial Trophy as the tournament's most outstanding goaltender.

Professional
On October 3, 2017, the Detroit Red Wings signed Fulcher to a three-year, entry-level contract. Following a championship winning season in junior hockey, Fulcher was assigned to the Toledo Walleye of the ECHL on September 27, 2018. During the 2018–19 season, Fulcher posted a 15–7–6 record with a 3.00 GAA and a .899 save percentage in 28 games for the Walleye in his first professional season. On March 3, 2019, Fulcher posted his first career shutout, in a 5–0 victory over the Indy Fuel.

On March 31, 2019, Fulcher was recalled by the Red Wings under emergency conditions. On April 6, he made his NHL debut for the Red Wings in a game against the Buffalo Sabres, replacing an injured Jimmy Howard in the second period, making nine saves on 11 shots in 28 minutes. Following the completion of the Red Wings' season, Fulcher was re-assigned to the Walleye the next day and added to their playoff roster. 

On January 12, 2021, the Red Wings assigned Fulcher to the Grand Rapids Griffins of the American Hockey League (AHL). 

As a free agent from the Red Wings, following four seasons within the organization, Fulcher remained un-signed leading into the 2022–23 season. He returned to the professional ranks on December 17, 2022, in signing a contract with ECHL club, the Reading Royals. After making his debut with the Royals, Fulcher was soon loaned to AHL club, the Syracuse Crunch, in January 2023.

Career statistics

See also
List of players who played only one game in the NHL

References

External links
 

1998 births
Living people
Canadian ice hockey goaltenders
Detroit Red Wings players
Grand Rapids Griffins players
Hamilton Bulldogs (OHL) players
Ice hockey people from Ontario
Reading Royals players
Sarnia Sting players
Syracuse Crunch players
Toledo Walleye players
Undrafted National Hockey League players